The 2012 Mr. Olympia contest was an IFBB professional bodybuilding competition and the feature event of Joe Weider's Olympia Fitness & Performance Weekend 2012 held September 27–30, 2012 at the Las Vegas Convention Center and Orleans Arena in Las Vegas, Nevada.  It was the 48th Mr. Olympia competition.  Other events at the exhibition included the 212 Olympia Showdown, 
Ms. Olympia, Fitness Olympia, and Figure Olympia contests.  The documentary film Generation Iron was filmed while following several Olympia contestants as they prepared for this competition.

Results
A total prize pool of $650,000 was awarded.

Notable events
Phil Heath won his second consecutive IFBB Mr. Olympia title 
Kai Greene placed second, his best ever showing after finishing third in the 2011 Mr. Olympia contest
Evan Centopani placed eighth in his Mr. Olympia debut
Toney Freeman, at the age of 46 years, finished in seventh place
Jay Cutler, four-time Mr. Olympia, could not compete after undergoing surgery for a torn left bicep

See also
 2012 Ms. Olympia

References

External links 
 Mr. Olympia
 2012 Mr. Olympia Judging Finals (Video)

Mr. Olympia
 2012
Mr. Olympia 2012
2012 in bodybuilding
Mr. Olympia 2012